Reginald Clarence De Burgh Egan (24 April 1927 – 14 April 2014) was an Australian rules footballer who played with Footscray in the Victorian Football League (VFL).

Notes

External links 

1927 births
2014 deaths
Australian rules footballers from Victoria (Australia)
Western Bulldogs players
Port Melbourne Football Club players